The 2020–21 season is Reggio Emilia's 48th in existence and the club's 11th consecutive season in the top tier Italian basketball.

Kit 
Supplier: Macron / Sponsor: UNAHOTELS

Players

Current roster

Depth chart

Squad changes

In

|}

Out

|}

Confirmed 

|}

Coach 
Coach Maurizio Buscaglia was replaced by Antimo Martino but his contract was valid until he was called by Brescia for the role of head coach.

On loan

Competitions

Supercup

Serie A

Europe Cup

Regular season

Second round

Quarterfinals 

|}

Semifinals 

|}

Finals 

|}

References 

2021–22 in Italian basketball by club
2021–22 FIBA Europe Cup